The Mitsubishi F1M (Allied reporting name "Pete") was a Japanese reconnaissance floatplane of World War II. It was the last biplane type of the Imperial Japanese Navy, with 944 built between 1936 and 1944. The Navy designation was "Type Zero Observation Seaplane" (零式水上観測機).

Design and development
In 1934, the Imperial Japanese Navy issued a specification to Mitsubishi, Aichi and Kawanishi for a replacement for its Nakajima E8N floatplanes, which were used for short-ranged reconnaissance and observation missions from the Navy's warships. It had elliptical wings and great care had been taken to reduce drag, with the number of interplane struts and bracing wires minimised. The first of four F1M1s flew in June 1936.

While the F1M1 had better performance than the Aichi aircraft, it had poor stability both on the water and in the air, so the aircraft was redesigned to resolve these problems. The wings were redesigned, with straight tapered leading and trailing edges and rigged with greater dihedral, and the vertical fin and rudder were enlarged. The aircraft's floats were enlarged to increase buoyancy, and the Hikari engine was replaced by a  Mitsubishi Zuisei 14-cylinder radial, giving better forward visibility. As modified, the aircraft's handling characteristics were greatly improved, and the modified aircraft was ordered into production as the Navy Type 0 observation seaplane Model 11 (rei-shiki kansokuki ichi-ichi-gata, Reikan in short), with the short designation F1M2. 940 series aircraft were built in total (342 by Mitsubishi and 598 by Sasebo Arsenal and 21st Arsenal) in addition to 4 prototypes (older publications present higher production figures, i.e., 1,016 or 1,118).

The F1M2 had a maximum speed of 368 km/h (230 mph) and operating range of up to 1,072 km (670 mi) without external stores. It provided the Imperial Japanese Navy with a very versatile operations platform.

The F1M was armed with a maximum of three 7.7 mm (.303 in) machine guns (two fixed forward-firing and one flexible rear-firing) with provision for two 60 kg (132 lb) bombs.

Operational history

The F1M was originally built as a catapult-launched reconnaissance float plane, specializing in gunnery spotting. The "Pete" took on a number of local roles including convoy escort, bomber, anti-submarine, maritime patrol, rescue, transport, and anti-shipping strike; for example sinking Motor Torpedo Boat PT-34 on 9 April 1942. The type was also used as an area-defense fighter and engaged in aerial combat in the Aleutians, the Solomons and several other theaters. In the New Guinea front, it was often used in aerial combat with the Allied bombers and Allied fighters.

In 1945, at the war's end, Indonesians had taken some F1M2s to fight against the Dutch during the Indonesian National Revolution.

Survivors 
In february 2023, 4 Mitsubishi F.1M went on auction in the United States after being stored for more than 20 years (Link)

Variants
 F1M1
 Prototypes. Four built.
 F1M2
 Two-seat reconnaissance floatplane for the Imperial Japanese Navy.
 F1M2-K
 Two-seat training version.

Operators

  Indonesia
 Indonesian Air Force 
  Empire of Japan
 Imperial Japanese Navy Air Service
  Thailand
 Royal Thai Navy

Specifications (F1M2)

See also

References

External links

Notes

Bibliography

 Francillon, R.J. Japanese Aircraft of the Pacific War. London:Putnam, 1970. .
 Green, William. War Planes of the Second World War, Volume Six: Floatplanes. London: Macdonald & Co., (Publishers) Ltd., 1962.
 

F1M, Mitsubishi
Floatplanes
World War II Japanese reconnaissance aircraft
F1M
Biplanes
Single-engined tractor aircraft
Aircraft first flown in 1936